Kent Callister (born 9 November 1995 in San Diego) is an Australian snowboarder. He has competed at the 2014 Winter Olympics in Sochi. His great-grandfather's second cousin, Cyril P. Callister, invented Vegemite.

References

External links
 
 
 
 
 

1995 births
Snowboarders at the 2014 Winter Olympics
Snowboarders at the 2018 Winter Olympics
Living people
Olympic snowboarders of Australia
Australian male snowboarders
Sportspeople from San Diego